Martin Joseph Moffat VC (15 April 1882 – 5 January 1946) was an Irish recipient of the Victoria Cross, the highest and most prestigious award for gallantry in the face of the enemy that can be awarded to British and Commonwealth forces.

Details
Moffat first served in the Connaught Rangers and was 34 years old private in the 2nd Battalion, Prince of Wales's Leinster Regiment, British Army during the First World War when the following deed took place for which he was awarded the VC.

On 14 October 1918 near Ledeghem, Belgium, Private Moffat was advancing with five others across the open when they suddenly came under heavy rifle fire at close range from a strongly held house. Rushing towards the house through a hail of bullets, Private Moffat threw bombs and then, working to the back of the house, rushed the door, killing two and capturing 30 of the enemy.

He was also awarded the Croix de Guerre and the Military Decoration by Belgium. His VC and other medals are on display at the Lord Ashcroft VC Gallery in the Imperial War Museum, London. Copies of his medals and a photograph are on display in Sligo County Museum, Stephen Street, Sligo.

References

Listed in order of publication year 
The Register of the Victoria Cross (1981, 1988 and 1997)

Ireland's VCs  (Dept of Economic Development, 1995)
Monuments to Courage (David Harvey, 1999)
Irish Winners of the Victoria Cross (Richard Doherty & David Truesdale, 2000)
 Symbol of Courage - The Men Behind the Medal (Max Arthur, 2005)

External links
Location of grave and VC medal (Co. Sligo, Ireland)

1880s births
1946 deaths
Prince of Wales's Leinster Regiment soldiers
Irish World War I recipients of the Victoria Cross
British Army personnel of World War I
Deaths by drowning
Accidental deaths in the Republic of Ireland
People from Sligo (town)
Recipients of the Croix de guerre (Belgium)
Connaught Rangers soldiers
British Army recipients of the Victoria Cross